Medetera aberrans is a species of long-legged fly in the family Dolichopodidae.

References

Further reading

 

Medeterinae
Articles created by Qbugbot
Insects described in 1899
Taxa named by William Morton Wheeler